HBO Sports Bowling is the branding used for Professional Bowlers Association broadcasts on the HBO premium cable and satellite television network. Bowling was one of HBO's earliest programs, back when it debuted in the early 1970s. HBO's first bowling telecast was the Winston-Salem Open on June 10, 1973. About 21 PBA TV finals
aired on HBO from June 1973 through July 1975.

Dick Stockton, Marty Glickman, and Spencer Ross served as the play-by-play announcers and Skee Foremsky acted as the color commentator for the bowling telecasts.

See also
List of programs broadcast by HBO
HBO#Sports programming
PBA Tour#PBA Tour in the media

References

External links
HBO sports programming - Sports Video Group

Bowling television series
HBO Sports
HBO original programming
1973 American television series debuts
1976 American television series endings
HBO Shows (series) WITHOUT Episode info, list, or Article